Šourek (feminine Šourková) is a Czech surname meaning scrotum. Notable people include:
 Antonín Václav Šourek (1857–1926), Czech mathematician
 František Šourek-Tuček, Czech fencer
 Jan Šourek, Czech rower
 Jaroslav Šourek (athlete), Czech athlete
 Ondřej Šourek, Czech footballer

Czech-language surnames